The 2022 South Carolina Gamecocks football team represented the University of South Carolina in the 2022 NCAA Division I FBS football season. This season marked the Gamecocks' 129th overall season, and 31st as a member of the SEC East Division. The Gamecocks played their home games at Williams–Brice Stadium in Columbia, South Carolina, and were led by second-year head coach Shane Beamer.

The 2022 Gamecocks squad displayed significant growth under Shane Beamer's leadership in his second year as head coach. Despite inconsistent offensive production and a lackluster rush defense throughout the season, the Gamecocks finished on a high note, posting an 8–5 record and finishing the season ranked at No. 23 in both the Coaches and AP poll, their first top 25 finish in either poll since the 2013 season, when they finished No. 4 in the nation. Additionally, Shane Beamer became the first coach in program history to win back-to-back games against top ten opponents after beating #5 Tennessee and their in-state rival #8 Clemson in weeks 12 and 13, respectively. South Carolina's dominant 63–38 victory against Tennessee set the record for most points scored by an unranked team against a top-five team in college football history. During the same game, South Carolina quarterback Spencer Rattler turned in a legendary performance, throwing for 438 passing yards and six touchdowns, breaking the school record for most touchdown passes in a single game.

Previous season

The 2021 Gamecocks finished 7–6, with a 3-5 conference record. The season was highlighted by upset home wins over Florida and Auburn. The Gamecocks achieved bowl eligibility for the first time since 2018 and beat North Carolina in the 2021 Duke's Mayo Bowl 38–21.

Schedule
South Carolina and the SEC announced the 2022 football schedule on September 21, 2021.

Roster

Coaching staff

Rankings

Notes and references

South Carolina
South Carolina Gamecocks football seasons
South Carolina Gamecocks football